Kamrun Nahar Putul (died 21 May 2020) was a Bangladeshi politician.

Biography
Putul served as the Jatiya Sangsad member representing the Bogura-Joypurhat area, a reserved seat for women from 1996 until 2001.

Putul was married to Mustafizur Rahman, also an Awami League lawmaker elected in 1973. She died after suffering from the complications of COVID-19 on 21 May 2020, during the COVID-19 pandemic in Bangladesh.

References

2020 deaths
1950s births
People from Bogra District
Awami League politicians
7th Jatiya Sangsad members
Women members of the Jatiya Sangsad
Date of birth missing
Deaths from the COVID-19 pandemic in Bangladesh